Hustisford High School is a public high school located in Hustisford, Wisconsin. It serves students in 9th through 12th grade. It is part of the Hustisford School District and is housed in the same building as the Hustisford Junior High School (grades 6-8).

In 2010, enrollment in the Hustisford Junior/Senior High School was over 200.

Extracurricular activities
Student activities include Academic Bowl, FFA, Forensics, Math Bowl, Marching Band, Mock Trial, National Honor Society, Pep Band, Spanish Club, Student Council, and Yearbook.

Athletics
As of 2010, the Athletic Director is Glen Falkenthal.  The sports offered in Fall include football, volleyball, and cheerleading.  In Winter there is both boys and girls basketball, wrestling, and dance.  In Spring there is baseball, softball, soccer.

Recognition
The school was named one of the "Best High Schools" in America by U.S. News & World Report in 2010.

References 

Schools in Dodge County, Wisconsin
Public high schools in Wisconsin